Austrochloris is a genus of Australian plants in the grass family. The only known species is Austrochloris dichanthioides, found only in the State of Queensland.

See also 
 List of Poaceae genera

References 

Chloridoideae
Endemic flora of Australia
Flora of Queensland
Poales of Australia
Monotypic Poaceae genera